Truffle butter is a compound butter made with butter combined with other ingredients, including truffles or synthetic truffle flavorings such as 2,4-dithiapentane.

References

Spreads (food)
Butter